Genevieve Hidden (1926 – June 27, 2016) was French surgeon who specialised in lymphology. She was one of the first to demonstrate the safe transplantation of lymph nodes. She was a founding member of the European Society of Lymphology.

Early life and education 
Hidden was interested in anatomy and cadaver research. She completed her medical degree in 1958.

Career 
Hidden specialised in surgery and was made Chief of Clinical Surgery in 1959. In 1969, she became Professor of Anatomy and taught for thirty years. She was eventually made Chief of General Surgery at the Centre hospitalier intercommunal de Poissy-Saint-Germain-en-Laye where she focused on oncology, and the lymphatic system. She was the first to demonstrate that lymph node transplantation could be a safe procedure.

In 1979, Hidden joined together with other lymphology researchers to establish the European Society of Lymphology. She served as President in 1983, and helped to organise several critical scientific conferences.

Selected publications

References 

French women physicians

1926 births
2016 deaths
French surgeons

20th-century French physicians
Transplant surgeons
University of Paris alumni
French anatomists
French women academics